The Bathurst District was a historic district in Upper Canada. It was created in 1822 from the Johnstown District. Containing Carleton County, it existed until 1849. The district town was Perth.

History
In 1824, Lanark County was created from part of Carleton County, so that its constituent townships were divided as follows: 

In 1838, upon the creation of the Dalhousie District, the townships were reorganized as follows:

By 1845, all lands in the District had been surveyed into the following townships:

Effective January 1, 1850, Bathurst District was abolished, and the United Counties of Lanark and Renfrew replaced it for municipal and judicial purposes.

Further reading

Notes

References

Districts of Upper Canada
1822 establishments in Upper Canada
1849 disestablishments in Canada